The 2004 Boston Red Sox season was the 104th season in the franchise's Major League Baseball history. Managed by Terry Francona, the Red Sox finished with a 98–64 record, three games behind the New York Yankees in the American League East. The Red Sox qualified for the postseason as the AL wild card, swept the Anaheim Angels in the ALDS, and faced the Yankees in the ALCS for the second straight year. After losing the first three games to the Yankees and trailing in the ninth inning of the fourth game, the Red Sox became the first team in major league history to come back from a three-game postseason deficit, defeating the Yankees in seven games. The Red Sox then swept the St. Louis Cardinals in the World Series, capturing their first championship since 1918.

Offseason 

 November 28, 2003: Casey Fossum, Brandon Lyon, Jorge de la Rosa, and Michael Goss (minors) were traded by the Red Sox to the Arizona Diamondbacks for Curt Schilling.
 December 16, 2003: Mark Bellhorn was acquired by the Red Sox from the Colorado Rockies as part of a conditional deal.
 December 22, 2003: Gabe Kapler was signed as a free agent by the Red Sox.
 December 23, 2003: Pokey Reese was signed as a free agent by the Red Sox.
January 7, 2004: Keith Foulke was signed as a free agent by the Red Sox.

Pre-season events 
During the 2003–04 off season, the Red Sox acquired a starting ace pitcher; Curt Schilling, as well as a closer, Keith Foulke. Many visitors at their spring training at Fort Myers, Florida, were very enthusiastic about the 2004 Red Sox team. Expectations once again ran high that 2004 would finally be the year that the Red Sox ended their championship drought.

Regular season

Season standings

Record vs. opponents

Notable transactions 
 June 22, 2004: Curtis Leskanic was signed as a free agent by the Red Sox.
 July 14, 2004: Pedro Astacio was signed as a free agent by the Red Sox.
 July 21, 2004: Ricky Gutiérrez was acquired by the Red Sox from the Cubs as part of a conditional deal.
 July 24, 2004: Terry Adams was acquired by the Red Sox from the Blue Jays in exchange for minor leaguer John Hattig.
 July 31, 2004: As part of a four-team trade, Orlando Cabrera was acquired by the Red Sox from the Expos and Doug Mientkiewicz was acquired by the Red Sox from the Twins. In exchange, the Red Sox sent star shortstop Nomar Garciaparra and Matt Murton (minors) to the Cubs. In a separate trade, Dave Roberts was acquired by the Red Sox from the Dodgers in exchange for Henri Stanley (minors).
 August 6, 2004: Mike Myers was selected off waivers by the Red Sox from the Mariners.
 August 31, 2004: Sandy Martínez was purchased by the Red Sox from the Indians.

Opening Day lineup 

Source:

Roster

Road to a Championship 
The regular season started well in April, but through midseason the team struggled due to injuries, inconsistency and defensive woes, and fell more than eight games behind New York. A bright point came on July 24, when the Red Sox overcame a five-run deficit as Bill Mueller hit a game-winning home run to right-center off Yankees closer Mariano Rivera. The game also featured a now infamous brawl between Yankee superstar Alex Rodriguez and Red Sox catcher and captain Jason Varitek.

Red Sox General Manager Theo Epstein shook up the team at the MLB trading deadline July 31, trading the team's wildly popular yet often hurt and disgruntled shortstop, Nomar Garciaparra, to the Chicago Cubs, receiving Orlando Cabrera from the Montreal Expos and Doug Mientkiewicz from the Minnesota Twins in return. In a separate transaction, the Red Sox also traded AAA outfielder Henri Stanley to the Los Angeles Dodgers for center fielder Dave Roberts. With valuable players like Cabrera, Mientkiewicz, and Roberts in the lineup, the club turned things around, winning twenty-two out of twenty-five games and going on to finish within three games of the Yankees in the AL East and qualifying for the playoffs as the AL Wild Card.

The team played its home games at Fenway Park, before a regular season total attendance of 2,837,294 fans.

Game log 

|- style="background-color:#ffbbbb"
| 1 || April 4 || @ Orioles || 7–2 || Ponson (1–0) || Martínez (0–1) || Ryan (1) || 47,683 || 0–1
|- style="background-color:#bbffbb"
| 2 || April 6 || @ Orioles || 4–1 || Schilling (1–0) || DuBose (0–1) || Foulke (1) || 35,355 || 1–1
|- style="background-color:#bbffbb"
| 3 || April 7 || @ Orioles || 10–3 || Lowe (1–0) || Ainsworth (0–1) || — || 28,373 || 2–1
|- style="background-color:#ffbbbb"
| 4 || April 8 || @ Orioles || 3–2 (13) || López (1–0) || Jones || — || 31,121 || 2–2
|- style="background-color:#ffbbbb"
| 5 || April 9 || Blue Jays || 10–5 || Speier (1–0) || Timlin (0–1) || — || 34,337 || 2–3
|- style="background-color:#bbffbb"
| 6 || April 10 || Blue Jays || 4–1 || Martínez (1–1) || Halladay (0–2) || Foulke (2) || 35,305 || 3–3
|- style="background-color:#bbffbb"
| 7 || April 11 || Blue Jays || 6–4 (12) || Malaska (1–0) || López (0–1) || — || 34,286 || 4–3
|- style="background-color:#bbbbbb"
| – || April 13 || Orioles || colspan=6|Postponed (rain) Rescheduled for May 31
|- style="background-color:#bbbbbb"
| – || April 14 || Orioles || colspan=6|Postponed (rain) Rescheduled for July 22
|- style="background-color:#ffbbbb"
| 8 || April 15 || Orioles || 12–7 (11) || Groom (1–0) || Arroyo (0–1) || — || 35,271 || 4–4
|- style="background-color:#bbffbb"
| 9 || April 16 || Yankees || 6–2 || Wakefield (1–0) || Vázquez (1–1) || — || 35,163 || 5–4
|- style="background-color:#bbffbb"
| 10 || April 17 || Yankees || 5–2 || Schilling (2–0) || Mussina (1–3) || — || 35,023 || 6–4
|- style="background-color:#ffbbbb"
| 11 || April 18 || Yankees || 7–3 (10) || Quantrill (1–0) || Lowe (1–1) || — || 35,011 || 6–5
|- style="background-color:#bbffbb"
| 12 || April 19 || Yankees || 5–4 || Timlin (1–1) || Gordon (0–1) || Foulke (3) || 35,027 || 7–5
|- style="background-color:#bbffbb"
| 13 || April 20 || @ Blue Jays || 4–2 || Martínez (2–1) || Halladay (1–3) || Foulke (4) || 26,010 || 8–5
|- style="background-color:#bbffbb"
| 14 || April 21 || @ Blue Jays || 4–2 || Wakefield (2–0) || Lilly (0–2) || Foulke (5) || 16,163 || 9–5
|- style="background-color:#ffbbbb"
| 15 || April 22 || @ Blue Jays || 7–3 || Adams (2–0) || Schilling (2–1) || — || 16,480 || 9–6
|- style="background-color:#bbffbb"
| 16 || April 23 || @ Yankees || 11–2 || Lowe (2–1) || Contreras (0–2) || — || 55,001 || 10–6
|- style="background-color:#bbffbb"
| 17 || April 24 || @ Yankees || 3–2 (12) || Foulke (1–0) || Quantrill (2–1) || Timlin (1) || 55,195 || 11–6
|- style="background-color:#bbffbb"
| 18 || April 25 || @ Yankees || 2–0 || Martínez (3–1) || Vázquez (2–2) || Williamson (1) || 55,338 || 12–6
|- style="background-color:#bbbbbb"
| – || April 27 || Devil Rays || colspan=6|Postponed (rain) Rescheduled for April 29
|- style="background-color:#bbffbb"
| 19 || April 28 || Devil Rays || 6–0 || Schilling (3–1) || Abbott (2–2) || — || 35,120 || 13–6
|- style="background-color:#bbffbb"
| 20 || April 29 || Devil Rays || 4–0 || Kim (1–0) || Zambrano (3–2) || — || 35,614 || 14–6
|- style="background-color:#bbffbb"
| 21 || April 29 || Devil Rays || 7–3 || Lowe (3–1) || Moss (0–1) || — || 35,441 || 15–6
|- style="background-color:#bbbbbb"
| – || April 30 || @ Rangers || colspan=6|Postponed (rain) Rescheduled for May 1

|- style="background-color:#ffbbbb"
| 22 || May 1 || @ Rangers || 4–3 || Ramirez (1–1) || Malaska (1–1) || Cordero (8) || 44,598 || 15–7
|- style="background-color:#ffbbbb"
| 23 || May 1 || @ Rangers || 8–5 || Benoit (1–0) || Martínez (3–2) || Cordero (9) || 44,598 || 15–8
|- style="background-color:#ffbbbb"
| 24 || May 2 || @ Rangers || 4–1 || Dickey (4–1) || Wakefield (2–1) || Cordero (10) || 31,538 || 15–9
|- style="background-color:#ffbbbb"
| 25 || May 3 || @ Indians || 4–3 || Westbrook (2–1) || Schilling (3–2) || Betancourt (1) || 16,285 || 15–10
|- style="background-color:#ffbbbb"
| 26 || May 4 || @ Indians || 7–6 || Davis (1–2) || Lowe (3–2) || Betancourt (2) || 16,070 || 15–11
|- style="background-color:#bbffbb"
| 27 || May 5 || @ Indians || 9–5 || Arroyo (1–1) || D'Amico (1–2) || — || 17,370 || 16–11
|- style="background-color:#bbffbb"
| 28 || May 6 || @ Indians || 5–2 || Martínez (4–2) || Sabathia (1–1) || Foulke (6) || 26,825 || 17–11
|- style="background-color:#bbffbb"
| 29 || May 7 || Royals || 7–6 || Timlin (2–1) || MacDougal (0–1) || — || 35,280 || 18–11
|- style="background-color:#bbffbb"
| 30 || May 8 || Royals || 9–1 || Schilling (4–2) || Gobble (1–1) || — || 34,929 || 19–11
|- style="background-color:#ffbbbb"
| 31 || May 9 || Royals || 8–4 || May (1–4) || Lowe (3–3) || — || 34,589 || 19–12
|- style="background-color:#ffbbbb"
| 32 || May 10 || Indians || 10–6 || Durbin (3–3) || Kim (1–1) || — || 35,257 || 19–13
|- style="background-color:#bbffbb"
| 33 || May 11 || Indians || 5–3 || Embree (1–0) || Jiménez (0–2) || Foulke (7) || 35,401 || 20–13
|- style="background-color:#ffbbbb"
| 34 || May 12 || Indians || 6–4 || Lee (4–0) || Wakefield (2–2) || — || 35,371 || 20–14
|- style="background-color:#ffbbbb"
| 35 || May 13 || @ Blue Jays || 12–6 || Batista (1–3) || Schilling (4–3) || — || 20,876 || 20–15
|- style="background-color:#bbffbb"
| 36 || May 14 || @ Blue Jays || 9–3 (10) || Embree (2–0) || Ligtenberg (1–1) || — || 20,948 || 21–15
|- style="background-color:#bbffbb"
| 37 || May 15 || @ Blue Jays || 4–0 || Arroyo (2–1) || Hentgen (2–3) || — || 36,841 || 22–15
|- style="background-color:#ffbbbb"
| 38 || May 16 || @ Blue Jays || 3–1 || Halladay (4–4) || Martínez (4–3) || Adams (2) || 31,618 || 22–16
|- style="background-color:#bbffbb"
| 39 || May 18 || @ Devil Rays || 7–3 || Wakefield (3–2) || Hendrickson (2–4) || — || 12,836 || 23–16
|- style="background-color:#bbffbb"
| 40 || May 19 || @ Devil Rays || 4–1 || Schilling (5–3) || Bell (0–1) || Foulke (8) || 13,960 || 24–16
|- style="background-color:#ffbbbb"
| 41 || May 20 || @ Devil Rays || 9–6 || Sosa (1–0) || Lowe (3–4) || Báez (5) || 12,401 || 24–17
|- style="background-color:#bbffbb"
| 42 || May 21 || Blue Jays || 11–5 || Timlin (3–1) || Nakamura (0–3) || — || 35,287 || 25–17
|- style="background-color:#bbffbb"
| 43 || May 22 || Blue Jays || 5–2 || Martínez (1–0) || Ligtenberg (1–2) || Foulke (9) || 35,196 || 26–17
|- style="background-color:#bbffbb"
| 44 || May 23 || Blue Jays || 7–2 || Wakefield (4–2) || Batista (2–4) || — || 35,239 || 27–17
|- style="background-color:#bbffbb"
| 45 || May 25 || Athletics || 12–2 || Schilling (6–3) || Hudson (5–2) || — || 35,236 || 28–17
|- style="background-color:#bbffbb"
| 46 || May 26 || Athletics || 9–6 || Lowe (4–4) || Redman (3–3) || Foulke (10) || 34,931 || 29–17
|- style="background-color:#ffbbbb"
| 47 || May 27 || Athletics || 15–2 || Mulder (6–2) || Arroyo (2–2) || — || 35,438 || 29–18
|- style="background-color:#bbffbb"
| 48 || May 28 || Mariners || 8–4 || Martínez (5–3) || Piñeiro (1–6) || — || 35,134 || 30–18
|- style="background-color:#ffbbbb"
| 49 || May 29 || Mariners || 5–4 || García (3–3) || Wakefield (4–3) || Guardado (9) || 35,250 || 30–19
|- style="background-color:#bbffbb"
| 50 || May 30 || Mariners || 9–7 (12) || Martínez (2–0) || Putz (0–2) || — || 35,046 || 31–19
|- style="background-color:#ffbbbb"
| 51 || May 31 || Orioles || 13–4 || López (4–2) || Lowe (4–5) || — || 35,465 || 31–20

|- style="background-color:#ffbbbb"
| 52 || June 1 || @ Angels || 7–6 || Gregg (2–0) || Arroyo (2–3) || Percival (13) || 43,285 || 31–21
|- style="background-color:#ffbbbb"
| 53 || June 2 || @ Angels || 10–7 || Ortiz (2–4) || Timlin (3–2) || Rodríguez (2) || 43,205 || 31–22
|- style="background-color:#ffbbbb"
| 54 || June 4 || @ Royals || 5–2 || Gobble (3–3) || Wakefield (4–4) || Affeldt (6) || 28,182 || 31–23
|- style="background-color:#bbffbb"
| 55 || June 5 || @ Royals || 8–4 || Schilling (7–3) || May (2–8) || — || 29,968 || 32–23
|- style="background-color:#bbffbb"
| 56 || June 6 || @ Royals || 5–3 || Lowe (5–5) || Grimsley (3–2) || Foulke (11) || 22,964 || 33–23
|- style="background-color:#bbffbb"
| 57 || June 8 || Padres || 1–0 || Martínez (6–3) || Osuna (1–1) || Foulke (12) || 35,205 || 34–23
|- style="background-color:#ffbbbb"
| 58 || June 9 || Padres || 8–1 || Lawrence (8–3) || Arroyo (2–4) || — || 35,064 || 34–24
|- style="background-color:#bbffbb"
| 59 || June 10 || Padres || 9–3 || Schilling (8–3) || Valdez (5–3) || — || 35,068 || 35–24
|- style="background-color:#bbffbb"
| 60 || June 11 || Dodgers || 2–1 || Foulke (2–0) || Martin (0–1) || — || 35,173 || 36–24
|- style="background-color:#ffbbbb"
| 61 || June 12 || Dodgers || 14–5 || Weaver (4–7) || Wakefield (4–5) || — || 34,671 || 36–25
|- style="background-color:#bbffbb"
| 62 || June 13 || Dodgers || 4–1 || Martínez (7–3) || Nomo (3–7) || Foulke (13) || 35,068 || 37–25
|- style="background-color:#ffbbbb"
| 63 || June 15 || @ Rockies || 6–3 || Kennedy (5–4) || Arroyo (2–5) || Chacón (11) || 40,489 || 37–26
|- style="background-color:#ffbbbb"
| 64 || June 16 || @ Rockies || 7–6 || Jennings (6–6) || Schilling (8–4) || Chacón (12) || 39,319 || 37–27
|- style="background-color:#bbffbb"
| 65 || June 17 || @ Rockies || 11–0 || Lowe (6–5) || Cook (1–2) || — || 40,088 || 38–27
|- style="background-color:#bbffbb"
| 66 || June 18 || @ Giants || 14–9 || Timlin (4–2) || Williams (6–5) || — || 42,557 || 39–27
|- style="background-color:#ffbbbb"
| 67 || June 19 || @ Giants || 6–4 || Herges (3–2) || Embree (2–1) || — || 42,499 || 39–28
|- style="background-color:#ffbbbb"
| 68 || June 20 || @ Giants || 4–0 || Schmidt (9–2) || Arroyo (2–6) || — || 42,568 || 39–29
|- style="background-color:#bbffbb"
| 69 || June 22 || Twins || 9–2 || Schilling (9–4) || Lohse (2–5) || — || 35,261 || 40–29
|- style="background-color:#ffbbbb"
| 70 || June 23 || Twins || 4–2 || Silva (8–4) || Lowe (6–6) || Nathan (20) || 35,233 || 40–30
|- style="background-color:#ffbbbb"
| 71 || June 24 || Twins || 4–3 (10) || Balfour (2–0) || Foulke (2–1) || Nathan (21) || 34,827 || 40–31
|- style="background-color:#bbffbb"
| 72 || June 25 || Phillies || 12–1 || Martínez (8–3) || Abbott (0–2) || — || 35,059 || 41–31
|- style="background-color:#ffbbbb"
| 73 || June 26 || Phillies || 9–2 || Madson (5–2) || Arroyo (2–7) || — || 34,712 || 41–32
|- style="background-color:#bbffbb"
| 74 || June 27 || Phillies || 12–3 || Schilling (10–4) || Myers (5–5) || — || 34,739 || 42–32
|- style="background-color:#ffbbbb"
| 75 || June 29 || @ Yankees || 11–3 || Vázquez (9–5) || Lowe (6–7) || — || 55,231 || 42–33
|- style="background-color:#ffbbbb"
| 76 || June 30 || @ Yankees || 4–2 || Gordon (2–2) || Timlin (4–3) || Rivera (29) || 55,023 || 42–34

|- style="background-color:#ffbbbb"
| 77 || July 1 || @ Yankees || 5–4 (13) || Sturtze (3–0) || Leskanic (0–4) || — || 55,265 || 42–35
|- style="background-color:#ffbbbb"
| 78 || July 2 || @ Braves || 6–3 (12) || Cruz (2–0) || Martínez (2–1) || — || 42,231 || 42–36
|- style="background-color:#bbffbb"
| 79 || July 3 || @ Braves || 6–1 || Schilling (11–4) || Thomson (6–7) || — || 51,831 || 43–36
|- style="background-color:#ffbbbb"
| 80 || July 4 || @ Braves || 10–4 || Hampton (3–8) || Lowe (6–8) || — || 41,414 || 43–37
|- style="background-color:#bbffbb"
| 81 || July 6 || Athletics || 11–0 || Wakefield (5–5) || Zito (4–6) || — || 35,302 || 44–37
|- style="background-color:#bbffbb"
| 82 || July 7 || Athletics || 11–3 || Martínez (9–3) || Redman (6–6) || — || 35,012 || 45–37
|- style="background-color:#bbffbb"
| 83 || July 8 || Athletics || 8–7 (10) || Leskanic (1–4) || Lehr (0–1) || — || 35,144 || 46–37
|- style="background-color:#bbffbb"
| 84 || July 9 || Rangers || 7–0 || Arroyo (3–7) || Benoit (3–4) || — || 35,030 || 47–37
|- style="background-color:#bbffbb"
| 85 || July 10 || Rangers || 14–6 || Lowe (7–8) || Rogers (12–3) || — || 35,024 || 48–37
|- style="background-color:#ffbbbb"
| 86 || July 11 || Rangers || 6–5 || Shouse (2–0) || Foulke (2–2) || Cordero (27) || 34,778 || 48–38
|- style="background-color:#ffbbbb"
| 87 || July 15 || @ Angels || 8–1 || Washburn (10–4) || Lowe (7–9) || — || 43,623 || 48–39
|- style="background-color:#bbffbb"
| 88 || July 16 || @ Angels || 4–2 || Martínez (10–3) || Escobar (5–6) || Foulke (14) || 43,771 || 49–39
|- style="background-color:#ffbbbb"
| 89 || July 17 || @ Angels || 8–3 || Colón (7–8) || Wakefield (5–6) || — || 43,746 || 49–40
|- style="background-color:#bbffbb"
| 90 || July 18 || @ Angels || 6–2 || Schilling (12–4) || Lackey (7–9) || — || 43,613 || 50–40
|- style="background-color:#ffbbbb"
| 91 || July 19 || @ Mariners || 8–4 (11) || Myers (4–1) || Leskanic (1–5) || — || 42,898 || 50–41
|- style="background-color:#bbffbb"
| 92 || July 20 || @ Mariners || 9–7 || Lowe (8–9) || Piñeiro (5–11) || Foulke (15) || 46,024 || 51–41
|- style="background-color:#ffbbbb"
| 93 || July 21 || Orioles || 10–5 || Bédard (4–4) || Martínez (10–4) || — || 35,023 || 51–42
|- style="background-color:#ffbbbb"
| 94 || July 22 || Orioles || 8–3 || López (8–6) || Alvarez (0–1) || — || 34,697 || 51–43
|- style="background-color:#bbffbb"
| 95 || July 22 || Orioles || 4–0 || Wakefield (6–6) || Borkowski (1–2) || — || 35,370 || 52–43
|- style="background-color:#ffbbbb"
| 96 || July 23 || Yankees || 8–7 || Gordon (3–3) || Foulke (2–3) || Rivera (35) || 34,933 || 52–44
|- style="background-color:#bbffbb"
| 97 || July 24 || Yankees || 11–10 || Mendoza (1–0) || Rivera (1–1) || — || 34,501 || 53–44
|- style="background-color:#bbffbb"
| 98 || July 25 || Yankees || 9–6 || Lowe (9–9) || Contreras (8–4) || Foulke (16) || 35,006 || 54–44
|- style="background-color:#bbffbb"
| 99 || July 26 || @ Orioles || 12–5 || Martínez (11–4) || Bédard (4–5) || — || 42,113 || 55–44
|- style="background-color:#bbbbbb"
| – || July 27 || @ Orioles || colspan=6|Postponed (rain) Rescheduled for October 2
|- style="background-color:#ffbbbb"
| 100 || July 28 || @ Orioles || 4–1 || Borowski (2–2) || Schilling (12–5) || — || 42,113 || 55–45
|- style="background-color:#bbffbb"
| 101 || July 30 || @ Twins || 8–2 || Arroyo (4–7) || Lohse (4–8) || — || 34,263 || 56–45
|- style="background-color:#ffbbbb"
| 102 || July 31 || @ Twins || 5–4 || Rincón (9–3) || Embree (2–2) || Nathan (29) || 40,283 || 56–46

|- style="background-color:#ffbbbb"
| 103 || August 1 || @ Twins || 4–3 || Santana (10–6) || Timlin (4–4) || Nathan (30) || 38,751 || 56–47
|- style="background-color:#bbffbb"
| 104 || August 2 || @ Devil Rays || 6–3 (10) || Wakefield (7–6) || Hendrickson (8–9) || Foulke (17) || 21,835 || 57–47
|- style="background-color:#bbffbb"
| 105 || August 3 || @ Devil Rays || 5–2 || Schilling (13–5) || Bell (4–5) || — || 20,882 || 58–47
|- style="background-color:#ffbbbb"
| 106 || August 4 || @ Devil Rays || 5–4 || Harper (3–2) || Arroyo (4–8) || Báez (23) || 18,133 || 58–48
|- style="background-color:#ffbbbb"
| 107 || August 6 || @ Tigers || 4–3 || Novoa (1–0) || Lowe (9–10) || Urbina (18) || 40,674 || 58–49
|- style="background-color:#bbffbb"
| 108 || August 7 || @ Tigers || 7–4 || Martínez (12–4) || Bonderman (6–9) || — || 42,607 || 59–49
|- style="background-color:#bbffbb"
| 109 || August 8 || @ Tigers || 11–9 || Wakefield (8–6) || Robertson (9–7) || Foulke (18) || 40,098 || 60–49
|- style="background-color:#ffbbbb"
| 110 || August 9 || Devil Rays || 8–3 || Halama (6–5) || Schilling (13–6) || — || 35,172 || 60–50
|- style="background-color:#bbffbb"
| 111 || August 10 || Devil Rays || 8–4 || Arroyo (5–8) || Sosa (3–1) || — || 35,191 || 61–50
|- style="background-color:#bbffbb"
| 112 || August 11 || Devil Rays || 14–4 || Lowe (10–10) || Brazelton (4–4) || — || 35,091 || 62–50
|- style="background-color:#bbffbb"
| 113 || August 12 || Devil Rays || 6–0 || Martínez (13–4) || Hendrickson (8–11) || — || 34,804 || 63–50
|- style="background-color:#ffbbbb"
| 114 || August 13 || White Sox || 8–7 || Contreras (10–5) || Wakefield (8–7) || Takatsu (11) || 35,028 || 63–51
|- style="background-color:#bbffbb"
| 115 || August 14 || White Sox || 4–3 || Schilling (14–6) || Adkins (2–3) || Foulke (19) || 35,012 || 64–51
|- style="background-color:#ffbbbb"
| 116 || August 15 || White Sox || 5–4 || Buehrle (11–6) || Arroyo (5–9) || Takatsu (12) || 34,405 || 64–52
|- style="background-color:#bbffbb"
| 117 || August 16 || Blue Jays || 8–4 || Lowe (11–10) || Miller (1–2) || Foulke (20) || 35,271 || 65–52
|- style="background-color:#bbffbb"
| 118 || August 17 || Blue Jays || 5–4 (10) || Foulke (3–3) || Frederick (0–2) || — || 35,105 || 66–52
|- style="background-color:#bbffbb"
| 119 || August 18 || Blue Jays || 6–4 || Wakefield (9–7) || Batista (9–9) || — || 34,867 || 67–52
|- style="background-color:#bbffbb"
| 120 || August 20 || @ White Sox || 10–1 || Schilling (15–6) || Buehrle (11–7) || — || 38,720 || 68–52
|- style="background-color:#bbffbb"
| 121 || August 21 || @ White Sox || 10–7 || Arroyo (6–9) || Stewart (0–1) || Foulke (21) || 37,303 || 69–52
|- style="background-color:#bbffbb"
| 122 || August 22 || @ White Sox || 6–5 || Leskanic (2–5) || Marte (4–5) || Foulke (22) || 34,355 || 70–52
|- style="background-color:#ffbbbb"
| 123 || August 23 || @ Blue Jays || 3–0 || Lilly (9–8) || Martínez (13–5) || — || 27,145 || 70–53
|- style="background-color:#bbffbb"
| 124 || August 24 || @ Blue Jays || 5–4 || Wakefield (10–7) || Batista (9–10) || Foulke (23) || 22,217 || 71–53
|- style="background-color:#bbffbb"
| 125 || August 25 || @ Blue Jays || 11–5 || Schilling (16–6) || Towers (9–5) || — || 22,479 || 72–53
|- style="background-color:#bbffbb"
| 126 || August 26 || Tigers || 4–1 || Arroyo (7–9) || Johnson (8–12) || Foulke (24) || 35,153 || 73–53
|- style="background-color:#bbffbb"
| 127 || August 27 || Tigers || 5–3 || Lowe (12–10) || Maroth (10–9) || Leskanic (3) || 35,018 || 74–53
|- style="background-color:#bbffbb"
| 128 || August 28 || Tigers || 5–1 || Martínez (14–5) || Bonderman (7–11) || — || 35,032 || 75–53
|- style="background-color:#bbffbb"
| 129 || August 29 || Tigers || 6–1 || Wakefield (11–7) || Ledezma (3–2) || — || 34,268 || 76–53
|- style="background-color:#bbffbb"
| 130 || August 31 || Angels || 10–7 || Schilling (17–6) || Lackey (11–11) || Foulke (25) || 35,040 || 77–53

|- style="background-color:#bbffbb"
| 131 || September 1 || Angels || 12–7 || Adams (5–4) || Sele (8–2) || — || 35,076 || 78–53
|- style="background-color:#bbffbb"
| 132 || September 2 || Angels || 4–3 || Lowe (13–10) || Colón (13–11) || Foulke (26) || 35,050 || 79–53
|- style="background-color:#bbffbb"
| 133 || September 3 || Rangers || 2–0 || Martínez (15–5) || Wasdin (2–3) || Foulke (27) || 35,151 || 80–53
|- style="background-color:#ffbbbb"
| 134 || September 4 || Rangers || 8–6 || Young (1–1) || Wakefield (11–8) || Cordero (42) || 34,670 || 80–54
|- style="background-color:#bbffbb"
| 135 || September 5 || Rangers || 6–5 || Schilling (18–6) || Drese (11–8) || — || 34,652 || 81–54
|- style="background-color:#bbffbb"
| 136 || September 6 || @ Athletics || 8–3 || Arroyo (8–9) || Zito (10–10) || — || 37,839 || 82–54
|- style="background-color:#bbffbb"
| 137 || September 7 || @ Athletics || 7–1 || Lowe (14–10) || Redman (10–11) || — || 29,659 || 83–54
|- style="background-color:#bbffbb"
| 138 || September 8 || @ Athletics || 8–3 || Martínez (16–5) || Hudson (11–5) || Foulke (28) || 39,575 || 84–54
|- style="background-color:#ffbbbb"
| 139 || September 9 || @ Mariners || 7–1 || Madritsch (4–2) || Wakefield (11–9) || — || 29,656 || 84–55
|- style="background-color:#bbffbb"
| 140 || September 10 || @ Mariners || 13–2 || Schilling (19–6) || Franklin (3–15) || — || 38,100 || 85–55
|- style="background-color:#bbffbb"
| 141 || September 11 || @ Mariners || 9–0 || Arroyo (9–9) || Moyer (6–11) || — || 44,401 || 86–55
|- style="background-color:#ffbbbb"
| 142 || September 12 || @ Mariners || 2–0 || Meche (5–6) || Lowe (14–11) || — || 43,742 || 86–56
|- style="background-color:#ffbbbb"
| 143 || September 14 || Devil Rays || 5–2 || Kazmir (2–1) || Martínez (16–6) || Báez (27) || 35,118 || 86–57
|- style="background-color:#bbffbb"
| 144 || September 15 || Devil Rays || 8–6 || Myers (5–1) || Núñez (0–3) || Foulke (29) || 35,105 || 87–57
|- style="background-color:#bbffbb"
| 145 || September 16 || Devil Rays || 11–4 || Schilling (20–6) || Hendrickson (8–15) || — || 35,048 || 88–57
|- style="background-color:#bbffbb"
| 146 || September 17 || @ Yankees || 3–2 || Timlin (5–4) || Rivera (4–2) || Foulke (30) || 55,128 || 89–57
|- style="background-color:#ffbbbb"
| 147 || September 18 || @ Yankees || 14–4 || Lieber (12–8) || Lowe (14–12) || — || 55,153 || 89–58
|- style="background-color:#ffbbbb"
| 148 || September 19 || @ Yankees || 11–1 || Mussina (12–9) || Martínez (16–7) || — || 55,142 || 89–59
|- style="background-color:#ffbbbb"
| 149 || September 20 || Orioles || 10–6 || Grimsley (5–6) || Wakefield (11–10) || Julio (22) || 34,758 || 89–60
|- style="background-color:#bbffbb"
| 150 || September 21 || Orioles || 3–2 || Foulke (4–3) || Ryan (3–6) || — || 35,083 || 90–60
|- style="background-color:#bbffbb"
| 151 || September 22 || Orioles || 7–6 (12) || Leskanic (3–5) || Bauer (1–1) || — || 35,103 || 91–60
|- style="background-color:#ffbbbb"
| 152 || September 23 || Orioles || 9–7 || Williams (2–0) || Mendoza (1–1) || — || 35,026 || 91–61
|- style="background-color:#ffbbbb"
| 153 || September 24 || Yankees || 6–4 || Gordon (8–4) || Martínez (16–8) || Rivera (51) || 35,022 || 91–62
|- style="background-color:#bbffbb"
| 154 || September 25 || Yankees || 12–5 || Foulke (5–3) || Quantrill (6–3) || — || 34,856 || 92–62
|- style="background-color:#bbffbb"
| 155 || September 26 || Yankees || 11–4 || Schilling (21–6) || Brown (10–5) || — || 34,582 || 93–62
|- style="background-color:#bbffbb"
| 156 || September 27 || @ Devil Rays || 7–3 || Arroyo (10–9) || Sosa (4–7) || — || 17,602 || 94–62
|- style="background-color:#bbffbb"
| 157 || September 28 || @ Devil Rays || 10–8 (11) || Mendoza (2–1) || Báez (4–4) || Foulke (31) || 20,116 || 95–62
|- style="background-color:#ffbbbb"
| 158 || September 29 || @ Devil Rays || 9–4 || Waechter (5–7) || Martínez (16–9) || Miller (1) || 21,274 || 95–63

|- style="background-color:#bbffbb"
| 159 || October 1 || @ Orioles || 8–3 || Wakefield (12–10) || López (14–9) || — || 39,086 || 96–63
|- style="background-color:#bbffbb"
| 160 || October 2 || @ Orioles || 7–5 || Adams (6–4) || Cabrera (12–8) || Foulke (32) || 48,540 || 97–63
|- style="background-color:#bbffbb"
| 161 || October 2 || @ Orioles || 7–5 || Kim (2–1) || Grimsley (5–7) || Leskanic (4) || 47,320 || 98–63
|- style="background-color:#ffbbbb"
| 162 || October 3 || @ Orioles || 3–2 || Chen (2–1) || Williamson (0–1) || Ryan (3) || 42,104 || 98–64

Postseason game log 

|- style="text-align:center; background:#bfb;"
| 1  || October 5 || @ Angels || 9–3 || Schilling (1–0) || Washburn (0–1) || — || Angel Stadium of Anaheim || 44,608 || 1–0 || W1
|- style="text-align:center; background:#bfb;"
| 2  || October 6 || @ Angels || 8–3 || Martínez (1–0) || Rodríguez (0–1) || Foulke (1) || Angel Stadium of Anaheim || 45,118 || 2–0 || W2
|- style="text-align:center; background:#bfb;"
| 3  || October 8 || Angels || 8–6 (10) || Lowe (1–0) || Rodríguez (0–2) || — || Fenway Park || 35,547 || 3–0 || W3
|- style="text-align:center; style="background-color:#009900;color:white;"
|colspan="11" | Red Sox win Series 3–0
|-

|- style="text-align:center; background:#fbb;"
| 1 || October 12 || @ Yankees || 7–10 || Mussina (1–0) || Schilling (0–1) || Rivera (1) || Yankee Stadium (I) || 56,135 || 0–1 || L1
|- style="text-align:center; background:#fbb;"
| 2 || October 13 || @ Yankees || 1–3 || Lieber (1–0) || Martínez (0–1) || Rivera (2) || Yankee Stadium (I) || 56,136 || 0–2 || L2
|- style="text-align:center; background:#fbb;"
| 3 || October 16 || Yankees || 8–19 || Vázquez (1–0) || Mendoza (0–1) || — || Fenway Park || 35,126 || 0–3 || L3
|- style="text-align:center; background:#bfb;"
| 4  || October 17|| Yankees || 6–4 (12) || Leskanic (1–0) || Quantrill (0–1) || — || Fenway Park || 34,826 || 1–3 || W1
|- style="text-align:center; background:#bfb;"
| 5 || October 18|| Yankees || 5–4 (14) || Wakefield (1–0) || Loaiza (0–1) || — || Fenway Park || 35,120 || 2–3 || W2
|- style="text-align:center; background:#bfb;"
| 6 || October 19 || @ Yankees || 4–2 || Schilling (1–1) || Lieber (1–1) || Foulke (1) || Yankee Stadium (I) || 56,128 || 3–3 || W3
|- style="text-align:center; background:#bfb;"
| 7 || October 20 || @ Yankees || 10–3 || Lowe (1–0) || Brown (0–1) || — || Yankee Stadium (I) || 56,129 || 4–3 || W4
|- style="text-align:center; style="background-color:#009900;color:white;"
|colspan="11" | Red Sox win Series 4–3
|-

|- style="text-align:center; background:#bfb;"
| 1 || October 23 || Cardinals || 11–9 || Foulke (1–0) || Tavárez (0–1) || — || Fenway Park || 35,035 || 1–0 || W1
|- style="text-align:center; background:#bfb;"
| 2 || October 24 || Cardinals || 6–2 || Schilling (1–0) || Morris (0–1) || — || Fenway Park || 35,001 || 2–0 || W2
|- style="text-align:center; background:#bfb;"
| 3 || October 26 || @ Cardinals || 4–1 || Martínez (1–0) || Suppan (0–1) || — || Busch Stadium (II) || 52,015 || 3–0 || W3
|- style="text-align:center; background:#bfb;"
| 4 || October 27 || @ Cardinals || 3–0 || Lowe (1–0) || Marquis (0–1) || Foulke (1) || Busch Stadium (II) || 52,037 || 4–0 || W4
|- style="text-align:center; style="background-color:#009900;color:white;"
|colspan="11" | Red Sox win World Series 4–0
|-

Player stats

Batting

Starters by position 
Note: Pos = Position; G = Games played; AB = At bats; H = Hits; Avg. = Batting average; HR = Home runs; RBI = Runs batted in

Other batters 
Note: G = Games played; AB = At bats; H = Hits; Avg. = Batting average; HR = Home runs; RBI = Runs batted in

Pitching

Starting pitchers 
Note: G = Games pitched; IP = Innings pitched; W = Wins; L = Losses; ERA = Earned run average; SO = Strikeouts

Other pitchers 
Note: G = Games pitched; IP = Innings pitched; W = Wins; L = Losses; ERA = Earned run average; SO = Strikeouts

Relief pitchers 
Note: G = Games pitched; W = Wins; L = Losses; SV = Saves; ERA = Earned run average; SO = Strikeouts

Postseason

Division Series 

Boston began the playoffs by sweeping the AL West champion Anaheim Angels. The Red Sox blew out the Angels 9–3 in Game 1, scoring 7 of those runs in the fourth inning. However, the Sox' 2003 off season prize pickup Curt Schilling suffered a torn tendon when he was hit by a line drive. The injury was exacerbated when Schilling fielded a ball rolling down the first base line. The second game, pitched by Pedro Martínez, stayed close until Boston scored four in the ninth to win 8–3. In game three, what looked to be a blowout turned out to be a nail-biter, as Vladimir Guerrero hit a grand slam off Mike Timlin in the top of the seventh inning to tie it at six. However, David Ortiz, who was noted for his clutch hitting, delivered in the 10th inning with a game winning two-run homer, off Jarrod Washburn, sailing over the Green Monster. The Red Sox advanced to a rematch in the 2004 American League Championship Series against their bitter rivals, the New York Yankees.

League Championship Series 

Despite high hopes that the Red Sox would finally vanquish their nemesis from the Bronx, the series started disastrously for them. Curt Schilling pitched with the torn tendon sheath in his right ankle he had suffered in Game 1 of the Division Series against Anaheim, and was routed for six runs in three innings. Yankee starter Mike Mussina had six perfect innings, and held an 8–0 lead. Despite the Sox' best effort to come back (they scored seven runs to make it 8–7), they ended up losing 10–7. In Game 2, already with his Yankees leading 1–0 for most of the game, John Olerud hit a two-run home run to put the New York team up for good. The Sox were soon down three games to none after a 19–8 loss in Game 3 at home. In that game, the two clubs set the record for most runs scored in a League Championship Series game. At that point in the history of baseball, no team had come back to win from a 3–0 series deficit (only the 1998 Atlanta Braves and 1999 New York Mets had ever gotten as far as a Game 6).

In Game 4, the Red Sox found themselves facing elimination, trailing 4–3 in the ninth with Yankees closer Mariano Rivera on the mound. After Rivera issued a walk to Kevin Millar, Dave Roberts came on to pinch run and promptly stole second base, this being what many consider the turning point in the series. He then scored on an RBI single by Bill Mueller which sent the game to extra innings. The Red Sox went on to win the game on a two-run home run by David Ortiz in the 12th inning. In Game 5, the Red Sox were again down late, this time by the score of 4–2, as a result of Derek Jeter's bases-clearing triple. But the Sox struck back in the eighth, as Ortiz hit a homer over the Green Monster to bring the Sox within a run. Then Jason Varitek hit a sacrifice fly to bring home Dave Roberts, scoring the tying run. The game would go for 14 innings, capped off by many squandered Yankee opportunities (they were 1 for 13 with runners in scoring position). In the top of the 12th inning, the knuckleballing Tim Wakefield came in from the bullpen, without his customary "personal catcher", Doug Mirabelli. Varitek, the starting catcher, had trouble with Wakefield's tricky knuckleballs in the 13th: he allowed three passed balls in the top of the 13th. The third and last of those gave the Yankees runners on second and third with two out. The Red Sox were spared, however, as Rubén Sierra struck out to end the inning. In the bottom of the 14th, Ortiz would again seal the win with a game-winning RBI single that brought home Damon. The game set the record for longest postseason game in terms of time (5 hours and 49 minutes) and for the longest American League Championship Series game (14 innings), though the former has since been broken.

With the series returning to Yankee Stadium for Game 6, the improbable comeback continued, with Curt Schilling pitching on an ankle that had three sutures wrapped in a bloody white sock (red with a blood stain). Schilling struck out four, walked none, and only allowed one run over seven innings to lead the team to victory. Mark Bellhorn also helped in the effort as he hit a three-run home run in the fourth inning. Originally called a double, the umpires conferred and agreed that the ball had actually gone into the stands before falling back into the field of play. A key play came in the bottom of the eighth inning with Derek Jeter on first and Alex Rodríguez facing Bronson Arroyo. Rodríguez hit a ground ball down the first base line. Arroyo fielded it and reached out to tag him as he raced down the line. Rodríguez slapped at the ball and it came loose, rolling down the line. Jeter scored and Rodríguez ended up on second. After conferring, however, the umpires called Rodríguez out on interference and returned Jeter to first base, the second time in the game they reversed a call. Yankees fans, upset with the calls, littered the field with debris. The umpires called police clad in riot gear to line the field in the top of the 9th inning. In the bottom of the ninth, the Yankees staged a rally and brought former Red Sox player Tony Clark, who had played well against the Red Sox since leaving the team, to the plate as the potential winning run. Closer Keith Foulke however, struck out Clark to end the game and force a Game 7. In this game, the Red Sox completed their historic comeback on the strength of Derek Lowe's one-hit, one-run pitching and Johnny Damon's two home runs, including a grand slam in the second inning off the first pitch of reliever Javier Vázquez, and defeated the New York Yankees, 10–3. Ortiz, who had the game-winning RBIs in Games 4 and 5, was named ALCS Most Valuable Player.

Major League Baseball, the National Basketball Association, and the National Hockey League are three professional sports that feature best-of-seven games series in their playoffs. Coming back to win a seven-game series when down by three games has only been accomplished by four National Hockey League teams and only one Major League Baseball team in the history of the MLB, NBA, and NHL.
The 1942 Toronto Maple Leafs (NHL) came back from being down by three games to the Detroit Red Wings to win the 1942 Stanley Cup.
The 1975 New York Islanders (NHL) did the same when they came back to beat the Pittsburgh Penguins in the 1975 Stanley Cup Quarterfinals.
The Philadelphia Flyers (NHL), during their Cinderella run to the 2010 Stanley Cup Finals, came back from three games down to defeat the Boston Bruins to advance to the Eastern Conference Finals.
The Los Angeles Kings,in the 2013–14 NHL Playoffs defeated the San Jose Sharks in the first round, on their way to winning the 2014 Stanley Cup.

The Boston Red Sox are currently the only team in Major League Baseball history to overcome a three game deficit in either a league or a World Series championship.

2004 World Series 

The Red Sox faced the St. Louis Cardinals in the 2004 World Series. The third time would be the charm, however, as the momentum and confidence Boston had built up in the ALCS would overwhelm St. Louis. The Red Sox began the Series with an 11–9 win, marked by Mark Bellhorn's game-winning home run off Pesky's Pole. He later on said that he "just did what he needed to do." It was the highest scoring World Series opening game ever (breaking the previous record set in ). The Red Sox would go on to win Game 2 in Boston (thanks to another sensational performance by the bloody-socked Schilling). The Red Sox won both these games despite making 4 errors in each game. In Game 3, Pedro Martínez shut out the Cardinals for seven innings. The Cardinals only made one real threat — in the third inning when they put runners on second and third with no outs. However, the Cardinals' rally was killed by pitcher Jeff Suppan's baserunning gaffe. With no outs, Suppan should have scored easily from third on a Larry Walker ground ball to second baseman Bellhorn, who was playing back, conceding the run. But as Bellhorn threw out Walker at first base, Suppan inexplicably froze after taking several steps toward home and was thrown out by Sox first baseman David Ortiz as he scrambled back to third. The double play was devastating for St. Louis. The Red Sox needed one more game to win their first championship since the 1918 World Series. In Game Four the Red Sox did not allow a run, and the game ended as Édgar Rentería (who would become the 2005 Red Sox starting SS) hit the ball back to Keith Foulke. (This was the second time that Rentería had ended a Series, as he had won it for the Marlins seven years prior in the 1997 World Series.) After Foulke lobbed the ball to Doug Mientkiewicz, the Sox had won their first World Championship in 86 years. The Sox held the Cardinals' offense (the best in the NL in 2004) to only three runs in the last three games, never trailing in the Series. Manny Ramírez was named World Series MVP. The Red Sox won Game Four of the series on October 27, eighteen years to the day from when they lost to the New York Mets in the 1986 World Series. In fact, it came 18 years to the day they lost their last World Series game, as they would sweep the 2004 series.

The Red Sox performed well in the 2004 postseason. From the eighth inning of Game 5 of the American League Championship Series against the Yankees (a tie) until the end of the World Series, the Sox played 60 innings, and never trailed at any point. This was only the fourth World Series ever played in which the losing team had never held a lead.

To add a final, surreal touch to the Red Sox championship title, on the night the Red Sox won, a total lunar eclipse colored the moon over Busch Stadium to a deep red hue. The Red Sox won the title about eleven minutes before totality ended. Many Red Sox fans who were turned away due to no tickets for the game were allowed to watch the final inning from the confines of Busch Stadium after being let in free of charge.

Fox commentator Joe Buck famously called the final out, saying: 

The Red Sox held a parade (or as Boston mayor Thomas Menino put it, a "rolling rally") on Saturday, October 30, 2004. A crowd of more than three million people filled the streets of Boston to cheer as the team rode on the city's famous Duck Boats. The parade followed the same route the New England Patriots took following their victories in Super Bowls Super Bowl XXXVI in 2002 and Super Bowl XXXVIII in February.

Following their 2004 World Series win, the Red Sox replaced the dirt from the field as a "fresh start". They earned many accolades from sports media and throughout the nation for their incredible season.

Pitcher Derek Lowe said that with the win, the chants of "1918!" would no longer echo at Yankee Stadium again.

The Patriots win in the Super Bowl meant the Red Sox World Series win made Boston the first city to have Super Bowl and World Series champions in the same year in 25 years, when the Pittsburgh Steelers won Super Bowl XIII, followed by the Pirates winning the 1979 World Series. The Patriots winning Super Bowl XXXIX in the ensuing offseason made Boston the first city to have two Super Bowls and one World Series championship over a span of 12 months since Pittsburgh in 1979–1980.

Awards and honors 
 David Ortiz – Silver Slugger Award (DH)
 Manny Ramirez – Silver Slugger Award (OF)
 Kevin Youkilis – AL Rookie of the Month (May)

All-Star Game
 David Ortiz, reserve 1B
 Manny Ramirez, starting LF
 Curt Schilling, reserve P

Farm system 

VSL team was also known as Ciudad Alianza.

Source:

References

External links 
 2004 Boston Red Sox season at Baseball Almanac
 2004 Boston Red Sox season at ESPN
 2004 Boston Red Sox Draft Selections
 Review of the 2004 Red Sox championship MLB.com, 12/26/2021

Boston Red Sox seasons
American League champion seasons
World Series champion seasons
Boston Red Sox
Boston Red Sox
Red Sox